Slave Tribes is an accessory for the 2nd edition of the Advanced Dungeons & Dragons fantasy role-playing game, published in 1992.

Contents

Publication history
Slave Tribes was published by TSR, Inc. in 1992.

Reception

Reviews
White Wolf #35

References

Dark Sun supplements
Role-playing game supplements introduced in 1992